The 1963 Dallas Cowboys season was their fourth in the league, and also the first where the Cowboys were the only professional football team in Dallas, as the AFL's Texans relocated to Kansas City (and were rebranded as the Chiefs) during the offseason. 

The team failed to improve on their previous output of 5–8–1, winning only four games. The Cowboys also missed the playoffs for the fourth consecutive season.

Schedule

Conference opponents are in bold text

Game summaries

Week 5

Week 8

Week 10

Week 14

Standings

Season recap
The Cowboys were expecting to turn their fortunes around and have a good year, but won only three of their first ten games. 

The assassination of John F. Kennedy on November 22, 1963, stands out as an infamous moment in the season: not only was the nation's psyche impacted by this event, but the image of the city of Dallas was seriously tarnished. On November 24 - just two days after this historic event - the NFL decided to play its normal schedule of games, with the Cowboys traveling to face the Cleveland Browns.  

On game day, when the team was introduced, the public address announcer referred to the team as simply the Cowboys, while the crowd also vented their frustration and pain at Cowboys players and officials during the game. The Cowboys lost 17–27, and would go on to have only one more win in the remaining three games.

On September 29, 1963, Billy Howton became the NFL's all-time receiving leader, breaking Don Hutson's record for career receptions and receiving yards. He retired at the end of the year, after playing in 12 seasons with 503 catches, 8,459 yards and 61 touchdowns.

NFL Draft

Roster

References

Dallas Cowboys seasons
Dallas Cowboys
Dallas Cowboys